Jagal may refer to:

 JAGAL, a pipeline in Germany
 Jagal, Pakistan, a village in Punjab, Pakistan
 Jagal, the Indonesian title of the film The Act of Killing